Glycerol-3-phosphate 2-O-acyltransferase (sn-2-glycerol-3-phosphate O-acyltransferase, glycerol-3-phosphate O-acyltransferase) is an enzyme with systematic name acyl-CoA:sn-glycerol 3-phosphate 2-O-acyltransferase. This enzyme catalyses the following chemical reaction

 acyl-CoA + sn-glycerol 3-phosphate  CoA + a 2-acyl-sn-glycerol 3-phosphate

This membrane-associated enzyme is required for suberin or cutin synthesis in plants.

References

External links 
 

EC 2.3.1